The Tully Lough Cross is an 8th- or 9th-century Irish altar or processional cross, discovered by divers in 1986 at the bottom of Tully Lough, County Roscommon. Although its origin is unknown, it may be associated with a church in Kilmore, County Cavan. It is made from a wooden core covered with bronze sheets, and contains spirals derived from the Iron Age Celtic Ultimate La Tène style. Its dating is based on its use of amber and style of ornamentation.  

When found, the Tully Lough Cross had been broken into pieces, with its individual remains in very poor condition. In the late 1980s, in a project overseen by the archeologist Eamonn P. Kelly of the National Museum of Ireland (NMI), it was extensively repaired and a number of lost metal parts were replaced, with a reconstruction based on a representation of similar crosses from contemporary Irish manuscript illustrations and high crosses.

The divers failed to report the finding of this highly-important object of national heritage to the Irish government, as required by law. One of them was later prosecuted for trying to sell it to a number of American museums including the Getty in California at an offer price of $1.75m. It was acquired by the NMI, Kildare Street, Dublin, in 1990, and is on permanent display in the museum's Treasury room.

Discovery
The cross was found by a diver in July 1986 at the bottom of Tully Lough, County Roscommon, by a crannog (an artificial island used for dwelling). The divers failed, as required by law, to report the finding to the Irish government, and attempted to sell the item to a number of museums in America. The Irish government learned of the matter when the J. Paul Getty Museum in California notified the National Museum of Ireland (NMI) that they had been contacted via a letter by "a lady in Massachusetts ... acting on behalf of two friends". She said she felt that, "a modest request would be 1.75 million dollars", before adding that she wanted the offer "kept in the utmost confidence".

Dr Michael Ryan, then Keeper of Irish Antiquities at the NMI, informed the Getty that the cross had been "illicitly excavated from an Irish site ... and represents part of a pattern of plundering of our heritage which is currently the subject of a top-level investigation". The investigation eventually led to one of the discoverers being convicted in the Athlone District Court, after the Irish Government, at the request of the NMI, "decided to get tough with metal detectors and treasure hunters".

The case led to a change in Irish law after the T.D. Tom Enright sought an amendment to the Irish Constitution prohibiting the foreign sale of historically significant heritage artifacts, and raising the minimal penalty from £50 (as was the fine in this case) to £50,000 or six months in prison.

Description

When rediscovered, it was broken into a number of pieces, but it is not known whether it was dismantled before it was deposited in the lake, or whether it broke on first impact with the lough bed or disintegrated due to centuries of wear. It was probably deposited in the mid-12th century during the Irish Church reform.

The cross' basic form is of the Latin type, and it probably functioned as both an altar and ceremonial processional cross. It is constructed from an oak core lined with plain tinned copper-alloy (bronze) sheets that form the upright and crosspiece. The metal sheets were tinned to add a sheen reminiscent of silver. The sheets are connected by tubular binding strips, and at the middle by a halved joint, an iron nail, and bronze fittings shaped as animal heads. It contains a number of gilt pyramidal and circular bosses and mounts. 

The metalwork contains about twenty surviving bronze panels, many of which are highly-decorated with ornate patterns and designs influenced by the late Iron Age La Tène style. Three contain interlace, and the two figurative panels, at the top of the upper arm and halfway down between the crosspiece and base, have openwork. The reverse is less decorated but does contain bosses and mounts.

The figurative panels are near-identical, with both showing a man dressed in a kilt reaching beyond his knees, standing between two confronted animals, and may represent either the Nativity of Jesus as prophesied, according to some Christian interpretations, in Habakkuk 3:2 ("In the midst of two animals Thou shalt become known") or the biblical tale of Daniel in the lions' den. The man's eyes are closed in the upper panel, but open in the lower arm.

Similar works
The cross bears a number of similarities to the better-known, 12th-century Cross of Cong, including its cusped cross-arms and elaborate glass studs, indicating that its basic form was in use for at least four centuries.

Although there is no other surviving Irish contemporary cross of this type, representations of the form can be found in some manuscript illustrations and high crosses, including the Ruthwell Cross found in Dumfriesshire, Scotland. The very similar Anglo-Saxon Cross of Saint Rupert is now in Bischofshofen, Austria. Unlike the Cross of Cong, it is not thought to have been intended to contain a relic. A very similar pyramidal mount was found in the West Midlands in England in 2014, and has also been dated to the 8th or 9th centuries.

Notes

Sources

 Kelly, Eamonn. "The Treasury: content and context". Irish Arts Review (2002-), volume 28, No. 2, 2011. 
 Kelly, Eamonn. "The Tully Lough cross". Archaeology Ireland, volume 17, no. 2, issue 64, 2003. 
 Moss, Rachel. Medieval c. 400—c. 1600: Art and Architecture of Ireland. London: Yale University Press, 2014. 
 Murray, Griffin. "Irish crucifixion plaques: a reassessment. In: Mullins, Juliet; Ni Ghradaigh, Jenifer (eds): Envisioning Christ on the Cross: Ireland and the Early Medieval West. University of Notre Dame: Thomas F.X. Noble, 2014
 Murray, Griffin. "The provenance of an Irish crucifixion plaque". Archaeology Ireland, volume 26, No. 4, Winter 2012. 
 "News: National Museum gets tough". Archaeology Ireland, volume 1, number 2, December 1987. 

8th century in Ireland
9th century in Ireland
Collection of the National Museum of Ireland
Insular art
Irish art
Processional crosses
Medieval European metalwork objects